La Lettre du musicien is a periodical music magazine published in Paris, France, fifteen times a year for music professionals. Created in 1984, it is devoted to classical and electroacoustic music and reports on current musical events in France in this field as well as on pedagogy. Once a year, it publishes a special edition dedicated to the piano.

References

External links
 Official website
 La Lettre du musicien (collection in on-site consultation from 1986 with gaps) on the site of the Médiathèque musicale de Paris.

1984 establishments in France
Classical music magazines
French-language magazines
Music magazines published in France
Magazines established in 1984
Magazines published in Paris